James Ivan Roland (December 14, 1942 – March 6, 2010) was an American professional baseball relief pitcher. He played in Major League Baseball (MLB) for the Minnesota Twins, Oakland Athletics, New York Yankees, and Texas Rangers.
 
Roland entered the majors in 1962 with the Minnesota Twins, playing for them six years (1962–64, 1966–68), before joining the Oakland Athletics (1969–72), New York Yankees (1972) and Texas Rangers (1972). A starter converted to long relief duties, he possessed a hard fastball and a dominant curve, but his delivery was bothered by control problems for most of his career. His most productive season came in 1969, when he posted career-numbers in wins (five), earned run average (2.19), games (39) and innings pitched. After that his career declined due to a nerve problem in his throwing arm, pitching a combined 23 innings for Oakland, New York and Texas in 1972, his last major league season.

His only career shutout was at the expense of the Chicago White Sox, 3–0, at Comiskey Park on April 21, 1963. He gave up three singles on nine walks and seven strikeouts. On May 19, 1964, he defeated the New York Yankees at Yankee Stadium, 7–2, pitching 12 innings and facing 50 batters, in a victory where he went up against a lineup which included Roger Maris, Mickey Mantle, Elston Howard, Tom Tresh and Bobby Richardson.

In a 10-year career, Roland went 19–17 with a 3.22 ERA and nine saves in 216 pitching  appearances, including 29 starts, six complete games and one shutout, giving up 185 runs (161 earned) on 357 hits, while striking out 272 and walking 229 in  innings of work. In four minor league seasons, he had a 32–42 record with a 3.48 ERA in 111 games.

Roland died from cancer in Shelby, North Carolina, at the age of 67.

References

External links
, or Retrosheet, or Pura Pelota

1942 births
2010 deaths
Baseball players from North Carolina
Deaths from cancer in North Carolina
Charlotte Hornets (baseball) players
Denver Bears players
Florida Instructional League Twins players
Major League Baseball pitchers
Minnesota Twins players
Navegantes del Magallanes players
American expatriate baseball players in Venezuela
New York Yankees players
Oakland Athletics players
People from Franklin, North Carolina
Syracuse Chiefs players
Texas Rangers players
Tigres de Aragua players
Wilson Tobs players